The Lordship of Stargard (German: Herrschaft Stargard, Stargarder Land or Land Stargard) was a county first set up in the 13th century as the terra Stargardiensis and first documented in the area of the border between Brandenburg, Pomerania and Mecklenburg.

See also
Mecklenburg-Stargard
Battle of Gransee, fought in 1316 between Mecklenburger and Brandenburger armies over rights to the Lordship.

External links
 landesbibliographie-mv.de

History of Mecklenburg
Countships
13th century in the Holy Roman Empire
Former states and territories